Priscilla Muriel McQueen  (born 22 January 1949 in Birmingham, England) is a poet and three-time winner of the New Zealand Book Award for Poetry.

Early years and education
McQueen's family moved to New Zealand when she was four.
She was educated at Columba College in Dunedin and University of Otago (Master's with first-class Honours in 1971). Awarded honorary Doctorate in Literature by University of Otago in 2008.

Career
A poet and artist, she has published many collections, including two sound recordings and two selected works, of her poetry. In 2009 she was named New Zealand Poet Laureate. She also received the Prime Minister's Awards for Literary Achievement (Poetry) in 2010. Other awards include: NZ Book Award for Poetry 1983, 1989 and 1991; Robert Burns Fellowship at Otago University 1985 & 1986; Fulbright Visiting Writer's Fellowship 1985; Inaugural Australia-New Zealand Writer's Exchange Fellowship 1987; Goethe Institute Scholarship to Berlin 1988; NZ Queen Elizabeth Arts Council Scholarship in Letters 1992. Her most recent works are In a Slant Light, a poet's memoir (2016, Otago University Press), Poeta: Selected and New Poems (2018, Otago University Press), and a chapbook Qualia that is bundled with five other chapbooks by New Zealand poets in Bundle 1 (Maungatua Press 2020).

In 1999 McQueen was awarded the Southland Art Foundation Artist in Residence award, which allowed her to develop both poetry and painting simultaneously. Recent exhibitions of her art work include "Picture Poem", works by Cilla McQueen and Joanna Paul, at the Hocken Library, Dunedin, 2015 and an exhibition of intuitive musical scores, "What Happens", at the Brett McDowell Gallery, Dunedin, 2015.

Cilla McQueen's poems include themes of homeland and loss, indigeneity, colonisation and displacement. She writes as a descendant of the colonised on St Kilda in the Hebrides. Her writing also reflects her engagement with the history and present reality of the Maori people of Murihiku.

In the 2020 Queen's Birthday Honours, McQueen was appointed a Member of the New Zealand Order of Merit, for services as a poet.

Personal life
McQueen was married to New Zealand artist Ralph Hotere from 1973 until the 1990s, and together they set up a studio and living space at Careys Bay, near Port Chalmers. She currently lives in Bluff, at the southern tip of New Zealand's South Island.

Works
McQueen's work includes a variety of poetry books and poems over the past twenty-five years, including these volumes:

 1982: Homing In, John McIndoe
 1984: Anti Gravity, McIndoe
 1985: Buick Electra
 1986: Wild Sweets, McIndoe
 1988: Benzina, John McIndoe
 1989: Otherwise, recording on cassette, featuring music by Alistair MacDougall 
 1990: Berlin Diary, John McIndoe
 1993: Crik'ey: New and Selected Poems, 1978-1994, McIndoe Publishers
 2000: Markings: Poems and Drawings, Otago University Press
 2001: Axis: Poems and Drawings, Otago University Press
 2002: Soundings: Poems and Drawings, Otago University Press
 2005: Fire-penny, Otago University Press
 2006: A Wind Harp (compact disc)
 2010: The Radio Room, Otago University Press
 2014: Edwin's Egg and Other Poetic Novellas, Otago University Press
 2014: An Island, letterpress edition, Mirrorcity Press
 2016: In a Slant Light: A Poet's Memoir, Otago University Press
 2018: Poeta: Selected and New Poems, Otago University Press
 2020: Qualia, one of six chapbooks in Bundle 1, Maungatua Press

References

External links
 Interview with Cilla McQueen
 McQueen on video reading poems

1949 births
Living people
New Zealand women poets
New Zealand Poets Laureate
People from Birmingham, West Midlands
English emigrants to New Zealand
University of Otago alumni
People from Bluff, New Zealand
People educated at Columba College
Members of the New Zealand Order of Merit
20th-century New Zealand women writers
21st-century New Zealand women writers